Three Brothers may refer to:

Film and television
 Three Brothers (1944 film), a U.S. Army animated short by Friz Freleng
 Three Brothers (1981 film), an Italian film by Francesco Rosi
 Three Brothers (2014 film), a film by Jan Svěrák
 Three Brothers (TV series), a 2009 South Korean drama
 The Three Brothers (film), a 1995 French comedy film

Literature
 "The Three Brothers", a story from Grimms' Fairy Tales
 Three brothers of Mémoires de M. d'Artagnan: Henri d'Aramitz, Armand d'Athos and Isaac de Porthau 
 Three sworn brothers of Romance of the Three Kingdoms: Liu Bei, Guan Yu and Zhang Fei

Places
 Three Brothers (New South Wales), three mountains in Australia
 Three Brothers, Chagos, a group of coral islands
 Three Brothers, Lancashire, a group of rocks in England
 Three Brothers (islands), Indonesia, or Rukan Islands
 Three Brothers, Okhotsk Sea, three large rocks off Eastern Cape, Kamchatka, Russia
 Tri Brata ('Three Brothers'), three rocks in the Avacha Bay, Kamchatka, Russia
 Three Brothers, South Georgia, a group of three mountain peaks
 Three Brothers (islands), Alaska, U.S.
 Three Brothers, Arkansas, U.S., an unincorporated community 
 Three Brothers (Ozarks), a group of summits in Arkansas, U.S.
 Three Brothers (Yosemite), a rock formation in Yosemite Valley, California, U.S.
 Three Brothers (Washington), U.S.,  triple-peak mountain summit 
 "Ostrova Tri Brata" ('Three Brothers Islands') in Antarctica: Aspland Island, Eadie Island, O'Brien Island 
 Three Brothers Hill, King George Island, South Shetland Islands

Ships
 Three Brothers (ship), a steam freighter that sank in 1911 near South Manitou Island on the Great Lakes
 USS Vanderbilt (1862) or Three Brothers, a steamship in the Civil War convert to a sailing ship for transporting grain

Other uses
 The Three Brothers (jewel), a lost medieval pendant once owned by Jakob Fugger, Elizabeth I, and others
 Three Brothers, Riga, a cluster of medieval houses in Riga
 Three Brothers Serbian Restaurant, in Milwaukee, U.S.

See also

 The Brothers Three, a pizza company
 "The Tale of the Three Brothers", a story in J. K. Rowling's The Tales of Beedle the Bard